Xingqing District is one of three urban districts of the prefecture-level city of Yinchuan, the capital of Ningxia Hui Autonomous Region, Northwest China, bordering Inner Mongolia to the east.

Characteristics

Xingqing District is the political, economic, scientific, cultural, financial, and commercial center of Yinchuan, the capital city of Ningxia Hui Autonomous Region. The district administers two villages and two towns. Although many Han Chinese live in the district, approximately 85,000 of its residents are of the Hui nationality. The district government is located on East Beijing Road, and the district's postal code is 750004.

Administrative divisions
Xingqing District has 10 subdistricts.

 Jiefangxijie
 Wenhuajie
 Funingjie
 Xinhuajie
 Yuhuanggebei
 Qianjinjie
 Zhongshannanjie
 Yingulu
 Shenglijie
 Lijingjie
 Fenghuangbeijie: was merged to other.

References

County-level divisions of Ningxia
Yinchuan